"Roiyaan" is a 2014 single by Pakistani recording artist Farhan Saeed. It was released on June 6, 2014 in the Pakistan as a digital download. "Roiyaan" is a love-inspired balled that details the protagonist is mourning over her deceased lover. The song was written by Indian lyricist Kumaar, while composed by Saeed along with Indian Punjabi musician Jaidev Kumar. The music video of the song is picturised upon Saeed and Sabeeka Imam.

Roiyaan was well received by critics, becoming one of the most successful singles by the singer. At 3rd Annual Hum Awards ceremony, it was nominated for Best Music Single for Farhan and Best Music Video for Yasir M. Jaswal.

Background 
From Farhan accounts, song lyrics were initially penned down by him as "saiyaan saiyaan teri aan teri aan" but when he met Indian lyricist Kumaar, he co-writes the song with singer and change the title line to "Roiyaan Roiyaan akhiyaan roiyaan". Song is also a composition of Farhan with the collaboration of Indian Punjabi musician Jaidev Kumar. After completion many offers were made by Indian music producers to use the song in their upcoming films, but Farhan first decided to release the song in Pakistan. Farhan also serves as a producer to songs' music video. He approaches singer-composer and director Yasir Muhammad Jaswal to direct the music video of song and Sabeeka for the role, talking in an interview Farhan said, "I started looking for a good director who could do justice to its video and the only one I could think of was Yasir (Jaswal) as he heard the song and was in love with it; I had full faith in him. Sabeeka (Imam) was the female model who has been doing great in the fashion industry and was perfect for the role."

Music video

Synopsis
Video deals with the elements of love, separation and nostalgia featuring Saeed and model Sabeeka Imam. In the video female protagonist is mourning over the death of her lover, as she visits his grave and other places where they were once, she cries and remember him. While in the video her lover is constantly with her as apparition, watching over her and longing to hold her once again, she finally sees him and touch him, but he has to leave as he is dead.

Cast and crew

 Singer: Farhan Saeed
 Featuring Artist: Farhan Saeed and Sabeeka Imam
 Composed by: Farhan Saeed and Jaidev Kumar
 Lyrics: Kumaar
 Director: Yasir Jaswal
 Assistant Director: Ammar Arshad
 Producer: Farhan Saeed
 Presenter: Lb Tunes
 Label: Jaswal Films

Track listing

Digital download (2014)
"Roiyaan" featuring Sabeeka Imam — 5:06

Accolades
The single receives following nominations at 2015 Hum Awards:

See also
 "Shikva" by Faakhir

References

External links
 
 Roiyaan on Dailymotion
 Roiyaan on ARY Musik
 Roiyaan - Complete Lyrics on Lyrics translate
 Roiyaan at LB tunes

2014 albums
2014 singles
2014 songs